The busiest airports in Nepal are based on the data from Civil Aviation Authority of Nepal (CAAN).

In graph

International Airport

Domestic Airports

2019
The traffic in the airport in 2019 is shown in table below.

2018
The traffic in the airport in 2018 is shown in table below.

2017
The traffic in the airport in 2017 is shown in table below.

2016
The traffic in the airport in 2016 is shown in table below.

2015
The traffic in the airport in 2015 is shown in table below.

References

Airports in Nepal
Nepal